Archernis callixantha is a moth in the family Crambidae. It was described by Edward Meyrick in 1886. It is found on New Guinea and in Australia, where it has been recorded Queensland and New South Wales.

References

Moths described in 1886
Spilomelinae
Moths of New Guinea
Moths of Australia